The following is a timeline of the history of the city of Hialeah, Florida, USA.

20th century

 1921 - Hialeah founded with the first plan drawn up and the town named.
 1924
 Miami-Hialeah Florida East Coast Railway line and Miami River Canal Swing Bridge built.
 Hialeah Women's Club opens town library.
 1925
 Hialeah incorporated.
 Hialeah Park Race Track built for horse racing.
 Hialeah Chamber of Commerce established.
 1926
 Hurricane.
 Hialeah Seaboard Air Line Railway Station built.
 1927 - Hialeah-Miami Springs Vertical Lift Bridge opens.
 1944 - Home News begins publication.
 1948 - Town of Hialeah Gardens incorporated near Hialeah.
 1958 - City of Hialeah Public Library building opens.
 1961 - M.A. Milam Elementary School established.
 1969 - El Sol de Hialeah newspaper begins publication.
 1970 - El Día newspaper begins publication.
 1971 - Westfield Westland shopping mall in business.
 1973
 KC and the Sunshine Band (musical group) formed.
 TK Records and Colonial Twin cinema in business.
 1974 - Santería Church of Lukumi Babalu Aye established.
 1979 - Citrus Health Network founded.
 1980
 Miami Dade College Hialeah campus established.
 Apollo North cinema in business.
 1981 - Raúl L. Martínez becomes mayor.
 1982 - El Hispano newspaper begins publication.
 1985
 Hialeah station (Metrorail) and Okeechobee station (Metrorail) open.
 El Condado News begins publication.
 1987 - Mi Casa newspaper begins publication.
 Christian Gomez is born.
 1989
 Tri-Rail commuter rail Miami Airport station opens.
 Carmike cinema in business.
 1990
 April: Mayor Martínez indicted for racketeering and suspended from office.
 Population: 188,004.
 1993
 U.S. Supreme Court decides animal sacrifice-related Church of Lukumi Babalu Aye v. City of Hialeah in favor of freedom of religion (over city public health regulation).
 Carrie P. Meek becomes U.S. representative for 27th congressional district.
 1999
 Telemundo television headquarters relocated to Hialeah.
 City website online (approximate date).
 2000 - 75th anniversary of city founding.

21st century
 2005 - Julio Robaina becomes mayor.
 2008 - Westland Hialeah High School and City of Hialeah Educational Academy open.
 2010 - Population: 224,669.
 2011
 May: Carlos Hernández becomes acting mayor.
 November: Hialeah mayoral election, 2011 held.
 2013
 January: Ileana Ros-Lehtinen becomes U.S. representative for Florida's newly created 27th congressional district.
 July: Shooting at Todel Apartments.
 2014 - Aldi grocery chain opens store in Hileah.
 2015
 Miami Watersports Complex opens.
 Population: 237,082 (estimate).
  2021: Shooting.

See also
 Hialeah history
 List of mayors of Hialeah, Florida
 Timelines of other cities in the South Florida area of Florida: Boca Raton, Fort Lauderdale, Hollywood, Miami, Miami Beach, West Palm Beach

References

Bibliography

External links

 
 
 Items related to Hialeah, various dates (via Digital Public Library of America)

hialeah